Devon Bailey (born September 28, 1991) is a professional Canadian football wide receiver who is a free agent. He was drafted by the Edmonton Eskimos with the sixth overall pick of the 2014 CFL Draft. He played CIS football at St. Francis Xavier University and attended Our Lady of Mount Carmel Secondary School in Mississauga, Ontario.

College career
Bailey played for the St. Francis Xavier X-Men from 2010 to 2013. He recorded 87 receptions for 1,160 yards and six touchdowns in his career.

Professional career

Edmonton Eskimos 
Bailey was drafted by the Edmonton Eskimos in the first round of the 2014 CFL Draft. He was ranked No. 5 in the final CFL Scouting Bureau rankings in April 2014. He signed with the Eskimos on May 31, 2014. In his rookie season with the Eskimos, Bailey recorded 17 catches for a total of 219 yards.

Bailey recorded his first CFL touchdown on August 21, 2015 against the Hamilton Tiger Cats. The Eskimos won the 103rd Grey Cup against the Ottawa Redblacks on November 29, 2015.

In the 2016 CFL season, Bailey recorded two receptions for 83 yards and a touchdown.

Montreal Alouettes 
On April 20, 2017, the Montreal Alouettes signed Bailey to a one-year contract worth an estimated $84,000. He was released by the Alouettes on June 18, 2017.

Saskatchewan Roughriders 
On August 2, 2017, Bailey was signed by the Saskatchewan Roughriders.

BC Lions 
On February 19, 2020, it was announced that Bailey had signed with the BC Lions to a one-year contract. He was released on March 19, 2021.

References

External links
BC Lions profile 
St. Francis Xavier X-Men bio

1991 births
Living people
Canadian football wide receivers
Edmonton Elks players
Montreal Alouettes players
Saskatchewan Roughriders players
BC Lions players
Players of Canadian football from Ontario
St. Francis Xavier X-Men football players
Sportspeople from Mississauga